A coup d'état (French for 'stroke of state'), also known as a coup or an overthrow, is a seizure and removal of a government and its powers. Typically, it is an illegal seizure of power by a political faction, politician, cult, rebel group, military, or a dictator. Many scholars consider a coup successful when the usurpers seize and hold power for at least seven days.

Etymology 
The term comes from French coup d'État, literally meaning a 'stroke of state' or 'blow of state'. In French, the word État is capitalized when it denotes a sovereign political entity.

Although the concept of a coup d'état has featured in politics since antiquity, the phrase is of relatively recent coinage. It did not appear within an English text before the 19th century except when used in the translation of a French source, there being no simple phrase in English to convey the contextualized idea of a 'knockout blow to the existing administration within a state'.

One early use within text translated from French was in 1785 in a printed translation of a letter from a French merchant, commenting on an arbitrary decree or arrêt issued by the French king restricting the import of British wool. What may be its first published use within a text composed in English is an editor's note in the London Morning Chronicle, January 7, 1802, reporting the arrest by Napoleon in France, of Moreau, Berthier, Masséna, and Bernadotte: "There was a report in circulation yesterday of a sort of coup d'état having taken place in France, in consequence of some formidable conspiracy against the existing government."

In the British press, the phrase came to be used to describe the various murders by Napoleon's alleged secret police, the Gens d'Armes d'Elite, who executed the Duke of Enghien: "the actors in torture, the distributors of the poisoning draughts, and the secret executioners of those unfortunate individuals or families, whom Bonaparte's measures of safety require to remove. In what revolutionary tyrants call grand[s] coups d'état, as butchering, or poisoning, or drowning, en masse, they are exclusively employed."

Related terms

Self coup

Soft coup 
A soft coup, sometimes referred to as a silent coup or a bloodless coup, is an illegal overthrow of a government, but unlike a regular coup d'état it is achieved without the use of force or violence.

Palace coup 
A palace coup or palace revolution is a coup in which one faction within the ruling group displaces another faction within a ruling group.  Along with popular protests, palace coups are a major threat to dictators. The Harem conspiracy of the 12th century BC was one of the earliest. Palace coups were common in Imperial China. They have also occurred among the Habsburg dynasty in Austria, the Al-Thani dynasty in Qatar, and in Haiti in the 19th to early 20th centuries. The majority of Russian tsars between 1725 and 1801 were either overthrown or usurped power in palace coups.

Putsch 
The term Putsch ([pʊtʃ], from Swiss-German 'knock'), denotes the political-military actions of an unsuccessful minority reactionary coup. The term was initially coined for the Züriputsch of 6 September 1839 in Switzerland. It was also used for attempted coups in Weimar Germany, such as the 1920 Kapp Putsch, Küstrin Putsch, and the 1923 Beer Hall Putsch by Adolf Hitler.

During the Night of the Long Knives in 1934, a supposed putsch was the underpinning of a disinformation tactic by Hitler and other Nazi party members. After initiating a purge, the idea of an imminent coup allowed them to falsely claim the killing was justified (as a means to suppress an uprising). Germans still use the term  to describe the event, the term given to it by the Nazi regime, despite the unproven implication that the murders were necessary to prevent a reactionary coup.

The 1961 Algiers Putsch and the 1991 August Putsch also use the term.

Specific military garrisons are the sparking factor for a larger military revolt against the government.

Other 
Other types of actual or attempted unilateral seizures of power are sometimes called "coups with adjectives." The appropriate term can be subjective and carries normative, analytical, and political implications.

 Civil society coup
 Constitutional coup
 Counter-coup, a coup to repeal the result of a previous coup
 Democratic coup
 Electoral coup
 Judicial coup
 Market coup
 Military coup
 Parliamentary coup
 Presidential coup
 Royal coup, in which a monarch dismisses democratically elected leaders and seizes all power; for example the 6 January Dictatorship
 Slow-motion coup
 Slow-moving coup
 Slow-rolling coup

Revolution, rebellion 
A revolution or rebellion can have the same outcome as a coup, in that a ruler or government can be replaced by unconstitutional means. However, while a coup is usually made by a small group and planned beforehand, a revolution or rebellion is usually started more spontaneously and by larger groups of uncoordinated people. The distinction is not always clear. Sometimes, a coup is also labelled as a revolution by the coup makers to try to give it a form of democratic legitimacy.

Prevalence and history 

According to Clayton Thyne and Jonathan Powell's coup data set, there were 457 coup attempts from 1950 to 2010, of which 227 (49.7%) were successful and 230 (50.3%) were unsuccessful. They find that coups have "been most common in Africa and the Americas (36.5% and 31.9%, respectively). Asia and the Middle East have experienced 13.1% and 15.8% of total global coups, respectively. Europe has experienced by far the fewest coup attempts: 2.6%." Most coup attempts occurred in the mid-1960s, but there were also large numbers of coup attempts in the mid-1970s and the early 1990s. From 1950 to 2010, a majority of coups failed in the Middle East and Latin America. They had a somewhat higher chance of success in Africa and Asia. Numbers of successful coups have decreased over time.

Outcomes 
Successful coups are one method of regime change that thwarts the peaceful transition of power.
A 2016 study categorizes four possible outcomes to coups in dictatorships:
 Failed coup
 No regime change, such as when a leader is illegally shuffled out of power without changing the identity of the group in power or the rules for governing
 Replacement of incumbent with another dictatorship
 Ousting of the dictatorship followed by democratization (also called "democratic coups")

The study found that about half of all coups in dictatorships—both during and after the Cold War—install new autocratic regimes. New dictatorships launched by coups engage in higher levels of repression in the year that follows the coup than existed in the year leading to the coup. One-third of coups in dictatorships during the Cold War and 10% of later ones reshuffled the regime leadership. Democracies were installed in the wake of 12% of Cold War coups in dictatorships and 40% of post-Cold War ones.

Coups occurring in the post-Cold War period have been more likely to result in democratic systems than pre-Cold War coups, though coups still mostly perpetuate authoritarianism. Coups that occur during civil wars shorten the war's duration.

Predictors 
A 2003 review of the academic literature found that the following factors were associated with coups:

 officers' personal grievances
 military organizational grievances
 military popularity
 military attitudinal cohesiveness
 economic decline
 domestic political crisis
 contagion from other regional coups
 external threat
 participation in war
 collusion with a foreign military power
 military's national security doctrine
 officers' political culture
 noninclusive institutions
 colonial legacy
 economic development
 undiversified exports
 officers' class composition
 military size
 strength of civil society
 regime legitimacy and past coups.

The literature review in a 2016 study includes mentions of ethnic factionalism, supportive foreign governments, leader inexperience, slow growth, commodity price shocks, and poverty.

Coups have been found to appear in environments that are heavily influenced by military powers. Multiple of the above factors are connected to military culture and power dynamics. These factors can be divided into multiple categories, with two of these categories being a threat to military interests and support for military interests. If interests go in either direction, the military will find itself either capitalizing off that power or attempting to gain it back.

Often times, military spending is a indicator of the likelihood of a coup taking place. Nordvik found that about 75% of coups that took place in many different countries rooted from military spending and oil windfalls.

Coup trap 
The cumulative number of coups is a strong predictor of future coups. This phenomenon is called the coup trap. A 2014 study of 18 Latin American countries found that the establishment of open political competition helps bring countries out of the "coup trap" and reduces cycles of political instability.

Regime type and polarization 
Hybrid regimes are more vulnerable to coups than very authoritarian states or democratic states. A 2021 study found that democratic regimes were not substantially more likely to experience coups. A 2015 study finds that terrorism is strongly associated with re-shuffling coups. A 2016 study finds that there is an ethnic component to coups: "When leaders attempt to build ethnic armies, or dismantle those created by their predecessors, they provoke violent resistance from military officers." Another 2016 study shows that protests increase the risk of coups, presumably because they ease coordination obstacles among coup plotters and make international actors less likely to punish coup leaders. A third 2016 study finds that coups become more likely in the wake of elections in autocracies when the results reveal electoral weakness for the incumbent autocrat. A fourth 2016 study finds that inequality between social classes increases the likelihood of coups. A fifth 2016 study finds no evidence that coups are contagious; one coup in a region does not make other coups in the region likely to follow. One study found that coups are more likely to occur in states with small populations, as there are smaller coordination problems for coup-plotters.

A 2019 study found that when a country's politics is polarized and electoral competition is low, civilian-recruited coups become more likely. 

A 2023 study found that civilian elites are more likely to be associated with instigating military coups while civilians embedded in social networks are more likely to be associated with consolidating military coups.

In autocracies, the frequency of coups seems to be affected by the succession rules in place, with monarchies with a fixed succession rule being much less plagued by instability than less institutionalized autocracies.

A 2014 study of 18 Latin American countries in the 20th-century study found the legislative powers of the presidency does not influence coup frequency.

Territorial disputes, internal conflicts, and armed conflicts 
A 2017 study found that autocratic leaders whose states were involved in international rivalries over disputed territory were more likely to be overthrown in a coup. The authors of the study provide the following logic for why this is: "Autocratic incumbents invested in spatial rivalries need to strengthen the military in order to compete with a foreign adversary. The imperative of developing a strong army puts dictators in a paradoxical situation: to compete with a rival state, they must empower the very agency—the military—that is most likely to threaten their own survival in office." However, two 2016 studies found that leaders who were involved in militarized confrontations and conflicts were less likely to face a coup.

A 2019 study found that states that had recently signed civil war peace agreements were much more likely to experience coups, in particular when those agreements contained provisions that jeopardized the interests of the military.

Popular opposition and regional rebellions 
Research suggests that protests spur coups, as they help elites within the state apparatus to coordinate coups.

A 2019 study found that regional rebellions made coups by the military more likely.

Effect of the military 
A 2018 study found that coup attempts were less likely in states where the militaries derived significant incomes from peacekeeping missions. The study argued that militaries were dissuaded from staging coups because they feared that the UN would no longer enlist the military in peacekeeping missions.

A separate 2018 study found that the presence of military academies were linked to coups. The authors argue that military academies make it easier for military officers to plan coups, as the schools build networks among military officers.

Economy, development, and resource factors 
A 2018 study found that "oil price shocks are seen to promote coups in onshore-intensive oil countries, while preventing them in offshore-intensive oil countries." The study argues that states which have onshore oil wealth tend to build up their military to protect the oil, whereas states do not do that for offshore oil wealth.

A 2020 study found that elections had a two-sided impact on coup attempts, depending on the state of the economy. During periods of economic expansion, elections reduced the likelihood of coup attempts, whereas elections during economic crises increased the likelihood of coup attempts.

A 2021 study found that oil wealthy nations see a pronounced risk of coup attempts but these coups are unlikely to succeed.

A 2014 study of 18 Latin American countries in the 20th century study found that coup frequency does not vary with development levels, economic inequality, or the rate of economic growth.

Coup-proofing 
In what is referred to as "coup-proofing," regimes create structures that make it hard for any small group to seize power. These coup-proofing strategies may include the strategic placing of family, ethnic, and religious groups in the military; creation of an armed force parallel to the regular military; and development of multiple internal security agencies with overlapping jurisdiction that constantly monitor one another. It may also involve frequent salary hikes and promotions for members of the military, and the deliberate use of diverse bureaucrats. Research shows that some coup-proofing strategies reduce the risk of coups occurring. However, coup-proofing reduces military effectiveness, and limits the rents that an incumbent can extract. One reason why authoritarian governments tend to have incompetent militaries is that authoritarian regimes fear that their military will stage a coup or allow a domestic uprising to proceed uninterrupted – as a consequence, authoritarian rulers have incentives to place incompetent loyalists in key positions in the military.

A 2016 study shows that the implementation of succession rules reduce the occurrence of coup attempts. Succession rules are believed to hamper coordination efforts among coup plotters by assuaging elites who have more to gain by patience than by plotting.

According to political scientists Curtis Bell and Jonathan Powell, coup attempts in neighbouring countries lead to greater coup-proofing and coup-related repression in a region. A 2017 study finds that countries' coup-proofing strategies are heavily influenced by other countries with similar histories. Coup-proofing is more likely in former French colonies.

A 2018 study in the Journal of Peace Research found that leaders who survive coup attempts and respond by purging known and potential rivals are likely to have longer tenures as leaders. A 2019 study in Conflict Management and Peace Science found that personalist dictatorships are more likely to take coup-proofing measures than other authoritarian regimes; the authors argue that this is because "personalists are characterized by weak institutions and narrow support bases, a lack of unifying ideologies and informal links to the ruler."

Impact

Democracy 
Research suggests that coups promoting democratization in staunchly authoritarian regimes have become less likely to end in democracy over time, and that the positive influence has strengthened since the end of the Cold War.

A 2014 study found that "coups promote democratization, particularly among states that are least likely to democratize otherwise". The authors argue that coup attempts can have this consequence because leaders of successful coups have incentives to democratize quickly in order to establish political legitimacy and economic growth, while leaders who stay in power after failed coup attempts see it as a sign that they must enact meaningful reforms to remain in power. A 2014 study found that 40% of post-Cold War coups were successful. The authors argue that this may be due to the incentives created by international pressure. A 2016 study found that democracies were installed in 12% of Cold War coups and 40% of the post-Cold War coups. A 2020 study found that coups tended to lead to increases in state repression, not reductions.

According to a 2020 study, "external reactions to coups play important roles in whether coup leaders move toward authoritarianism or democratic governance. When supported by external democratic actors, coup leaders have an incentive to push for elections to retain external support and consolidate domestic legitimacy. When condemned, coup leaders are apt to trend toward authoritarianism to assure their survival."

According to legal scholar Ilya Somin a coup to forcibly overthrow democratic government might be sometimes justified.  Commenting on the 2016 Turkish coup d'état attempt, Somin opined,

Repression and counter-coups 
According to Naunihal Singh, author of Seizing Power: The Strategic Logic of Military Coups (2014), it is "fairly rare" for the prevailing existing government to violently purge the army after a coup has been foiled. If it starts the mass killing of elements of the army, including officers who were not involved in the coup, this may trigger a "counter-coup" by soldiers who are afraid they will be next. To prevent such a desperate counter-coup that may be more successful than the initial attempt, governments usually resort to firing prominent officers and replacing them with loyalists instead.

Some research suggests that increased repression and violence typically follow both successful and unsuccessful coup attempts. However, some tentative analysis by political scientist Jay Ulfelder finds no clear pattern of deterioration in human rights practices in wake of failed coups in post-Cold War era.

Notable counter-coups include the Ottoman countercoup of 1909, the 1960 Laotian counter-coup, the Indonesian mass killings of 1965–66, the 1966 Nigerian counter-coup, the 1967 Greek counter-coup, 1971 Sudanese counter-coup, and the Coup d'état of December Twelfth in South Korea.

A 2017 study finds that the use of state broadcasting by the putschist regime after Mali's 2012 coup did not elevate explicit approval for the regime.

According to a 2019 study, coup attempts lead to a reduction in physical integrity rights.

International response 
The international community tends to react adversely to coups by reducing aid and imposing sanctions. A 2015 study finds that "coups against democracies, coups after the Cold War, and coups in states heavily integrated into the international community are all more likely to elicit global reaction." Another 2015 study shows that coups are the strongest predictor for the imposition of democratic sanctions. A third 2015 study finds that Western states react strongest against coups of possible democratic and human rights abuses. A 2016 study shows that the international donor community in the post-Cold War period penalizes coups by reducing foreign aid. The US has been inconsistent in applying aid sanctions against coups both during the Cold War and post-Cold War periods, a likely consequence of its geopolitical interests.

Organizations such as the African Union (AU) and the Organization of American States (OAS) have adopted anti-coup frameworks. Through the threat of sanctions, the organizations actively try to curb coups. A 2016 study finds that the AU has played a meaningful role in reducing African coups.

A 2017 study found that negative international responses, especially from powerful actors, have a significant effect in shortening the duration of regimes created in coups.

According to a 2020 study, coups increase the cost of borrowing and increase the likelihood of sovereign default.

Current leaders who assumed power via coups

See also 

 Assassination
 Civilian-based defense
 Civil-military relations
 Civilian control of the military
 Coup d'État: A Practical Handbook
 Coup de main
 Kleptocracy
 Leadership spill
 List of protective service agencies
 Military dictatorship
 Political corruption
 Political warfare
 Sabotage
 Self-coup
 Seven Days in May
 Soft coup
 State collapse
 Succession crisis
 List of coups and coup attempts by country
 List of coups and coup attempts
 List of coups and coup attempts since 2010

References

Further reading 

 Luttwak, Edward (1979) Coup d'État: A Practical Handbook. Harvard University Press. .
 De Bruin, Erica (2020) How to Prevent Coups d'État. Cornell University Press.
 Schiel, R., Powell, J., & Faulkner, C. (2020). "Mutiny in Africa, 1950–2018". Conflict Management and Peace Science.
 Singh, Naunihal. (2014) Seizing Power: The Strategic Logic of Military Coups. Johns Hopkins University Press.

External links 

 
 
 John J. Chin, David B. Carter & Joseph G. Wright. Dataset on all military and non-military coup attempts in the world since 1946.
 Powell, Jonathan & Clayton Thyne. Global Instances of Coups from 1950–Present via Archive.org.

 
Changes in political power
Civil–military relations